Tan Liangde (born July 14, 1965, in Maoming, Guangdong) is a famous diver from PR China. He won silver medals in three consecutive Olympic Games from 1984 to 1992. He is currently a coach in Tianjin diving team.

Tan is married to Li Qing, who also won a silver medal in Seoul Olympics, and they have a daughter. The Olympic champions, Hu Jia and Wang Xin, are their students.

See also
 List of members of the International Swimming Hall of Fame

References
 sports-reference

1965 births
Living people
Chinese male divers
Divers at the 1984 Summer Olympics
Divers at the 1988 Summer Olympics
Divers at the 1992 Summer Olympics
Olympic divers of China
People from Maoming
Olympic medalists in diving
Asian Games medalists in diving
Sportspeople from Guangdong
Divers at the 1982 Asian Games
Divers at the 1986 Asian Games
Divers at the 1990 Asian Games
Medalists at the 1992 Summer Olympics
Medalists at the 1988 Summer Olympics
Medalists at the 1984 Summer Olympics
Asian Games gold medalists for China
Asian Games silver medalists for China
Olympic silver medalists for China
Medalists at the 1982 Asian Games
Medalists at the 1986 Asian Games
Medalists at the 1990 Asian Games
Universiade medalists in diving
Universiade gold medalists for China
Medalists at the 1983 Summer Universiade
Medalists at the 1985 Summer Universiade
Medalists at the 1987 Summer Universiade
20th-century Chinese people
21st-century Chinese people